The Riter Special is an American Homebuilt aircraft design.

Design and development
The Riter special is a single engine, low wing, single seat, retractable conventional landing gear aircraft. The wings fold upward for ground transport on a trailer. The landing gear is retracted by hand with a worm-gear mechanism.

Specifications (Riter Special)

See also

References

Homebuilt aircraft